Cho Ui-seok (born January 1, 1976) is a South Korean film director and screenwriter.

Career 
Cho made his debut with the action comedy Make It Big (2002). His third feature is the thriller Cold Eyes (2013). His fourth film was the star-studded thriller Master (2016), featuring Lee Byung-hun, Kang Dong-won and Kim Woo-bin. Released in December, it grossed US$34 million with 4.9 million total admissions, making it the No. 11 bestselling film for 2016 in Korea.

Filmography 
Illusion (short film, 1998) - cinematographer
We Can't Share A Toilet (short film, 1999) - cinematographer
How Have You Been, Man-soo? (short film, 1999) - cinematographer
Fanta Tropical (1999) - director, screenwriter
Barking Dogs Never Bite (2000) - cinematography department
Make It Big (2002) - director, screenwriter
Psycho Drama (short film, 2002) - actor
The World of Silence (2006) - director, script editor
Cold Eyes (2013) - director, screenwriter
Master  (2016) - director
Golden Slumber (2017) -  screenwriter

References

External links 
 
 
 

1976 births
Living people
South Korean film directors
South Korean screenwriters
Korea National University of Arts alumni